ARK is the fourth and final studio album by English rock band We Are The Ocean. It was released on 11 May 2015 in the United Kingdom. The album spawned three singles: "Ark", "Do It Together", and "Holy Fire".

Background 
Recorded in the summer of 2014, the band got new management on board, after the release of their last studio album, Maybe Today, Maybe Tomorrow, released in 2012. This is the first album to be written solely by the new line up, without any help from previous vocalist Dan Brown, who put work into their last release. This album marks the full departure from their original post-hardcore and pop punk sound, in favour of a more indie rock tone.

Track listing

Reception 
ARK received mixed to positive reviews from critics. drownedinsound.com gave it an 8/10 praising non-stop rock n' roll flow, quoting "Each [track] is chock full of energy, watertight and detailed rhythm section work, and pummeling into a state of death by melody and counter-melody."

Bring The Noise also gave the album a strong 8/10 review, they said "With one swift move, We Are The Ocean had evolved from a gritty post-hardcore outfit to a tightly wound alternative rock group that are capable of punching out a twelve song album that is the physical embodiment of everything that is good about modern alternative rock."

Alreadyheard.com gave a more mixed review saying the album is powerful but they aren't sure who on We Are The Ocean's new sound, saying "At times 'Ark’ is modern and at others classy, but it's also raw and polished. Sure variation is a good thing to have but once you're finished with 'Ark’, you're left confused as to who or what We Are The Ocean are now."

Mosh gave it a far more negative 2.5/5 stars quoting inconsistency in the album's sound.

Personnel 
Liam Cromby – lead vocals, rhythm guitar
Alfie Scully – lead guitar, vocals
Jack Spence – bass guitar, backing vocals 
Tom Whittaker – drums, percussion, backing vocals

References

2015 albums
We Are the Ocean albums
Hassle Records albums